Lineynaya is a rural locality (a railway station) in Lineyninsky Selsoviet, Narimanovsky District, Astrakhan Oblast, Russia. The population was 561 as of 2010.

Geography 
It is located 57 km from Astrakhan, 88 km from Narimanov.

References 

Rural localities in Narimanovsky District